Le Voyage étranger is a 1992 film by Serge Roullet featuring Karim Azkoul.

External links

1992 films
French drama films
1990s French films